Renzo Holzer (born March 9, 1952) is a retired Swiss professional ice hockey right winger who played in the Nationalliga A for SC Bern and HC Fribourg-Gottéron. He also represented the Swiss national team at the 1976 Winter Olympics.

References

External links

1952 births
Living people
HC Fribourg-Gottéron players
Ice hockey players at the 1976 Winter Olympics
Olympic ice hockey players of Switzerland
SC Bern players
Swiss ice hockey right wingers